Trapania tora is a species of sea slug, a dorid nudibranch, a marine gastropod mollusc in the family Goniodorididae.

Distribution
This species was described from Bali, Indonesia. It has since been reported from Kwajalein in the Marshall Islands.

Description
This goniodorid nudibranch is black or dark grey in colour, with a pattern of white patches and thin white lines forming a network on the body. There are raised, rounded tubercles on the back and behind the gills which are white. The gills, papillae and rhinophores are translucent with white superficial pigment. The oral tentacles have the body pattern at the base and white tips.

Ecology
Trapania tora feeds on Entoprocta which often grow on sponges and other living substrata.

References

Goniodorididae
Gastropods described in 2008